Wilmer "Andres" Cabrera Jr. (born July 29, 2000) is a Colombian footballer who currently plays for Rio Grande Valley FC on loan from Real Cartagena.

Career 
Cabrera spent time with the academy team at Colorado Rapids, before moving to the IMG Academy in Florida in 2016.

In May 2018, it was announced that Cabrera would spend time with Houston Dynamo's USL PDL affiliate side Brazos Valley Cavalry ahead of their 2018 season.

On June 3, 2018, Cabrera appeared for Houston Dynamo's United Soccer League side Rio Grande Valley FC as an 83rd-minute substitute during a 2-0 loss to Real Monarchs.

In October 2019, Cabrera Jr. left Rio Grande Valley to play college soccer at Butler University.

On December 22, 2022 Cabrera Jr. was drafted in the third round with the 76th overall pick of the 2023 MLS SuperDraft by Chicago Fire.

On March 3, 2023, it was announced that Cabrera had signed with Colombian Categoría Primera B side Real Cartagena, but was immediately loaned to his former club Rio Grande Valley FC.

Personal
Wilmer is the son of Wilmer Cabrera, currently the head coach of USL Championship side Rio Grande Valley FC Toros. His brother, David, was also a footballer.

References

External links
 

2000 births
Living people
Footballers from Bogotá
Colombian footballers
American soccer players
Association football forwards
Brazos Valley Cavalry FC players
Butler Bulldogs men's soccer players
Chicago Fire FC draft picks
Colombian emigrants to the United States
Expatriate soccer players in the United States
Rio Grande Valley FC Toros players
Soccer players from Colorado
Sportspeople from Aurora, Colorado
USL Championship players